Shadehill Dam is a dam (constructed 1951) on the Grand River in Perkins County in northwestern South Dakota in the United States, about  south of Lemmon. The dam and its impoundment, Shadehill Reservoir, serve mainly for flood and silt control, wildlife conservation and recreation. Located directly below the confluence of the North and South Forks of the Grand River, the dam is operated by the U.S. Bureau of Reclamation, and is part of the Shadehill Unit of the Pick-Sloan Missouri Basin Program.

A catchment area of  lies above the dam site.

Shadehill Dam was originally intended to serve irrigation purposes as well, but after determining that the water in the reservoir was too saline the Bureau of Reclamation dropped this phase from the project.

See also
List of dams in the Missouri River watershed
Pick-Sloan Plan
List of dams and reservoirs in South Dakota

External links
United States Bureau of Reclamation - Shadehill Dam
South Dakota Department of Game, Fish & Parks - Shadehill State Recreation Area

References

Buildings and structures in Perkins County, South Dakota
Dams in South Dakota
Embankment dams
Dams completed in 1951
United States Bureau of Reclamation dams